In 1972, Pakistan's largest city, Karachi, witnessed major labour unrest in its industrial areas of S.I.T.E Industrial Area and Korangi-Landhi. Several protesting workers were killed or injured by police during this period. In a number of cases, workers briefly occupied their factories.

Background 
Under military rule of Ayub Khan, the industrial class had given free rein and working class suffered. Labour activists were arrested and tried in military courts and trade unions were curbed. Uprising of workers and students during 1968 movement in Pakistan toppled Ayub Khan and power was taken over by Yahya Khan. The military regime continued to repress the working class movement and tried to prevent strikes and lockouts. Around 45,000 workers in Karachi alone were retrenched during Yahya Khan's tenure (1969-1971). Labour militancy increased as new regime of Pakistan Peoples Party installed on 20 December 1971. Zulfikar Ali Bhutto's initial anti-industrialist and socialists agenda encouraged a sense of elation among workers. They intensified their demands and during first months of 1972, whole country engulfed with periodic lockouts and encirclement of industries. Among them notable struggles were "Emergence of a worker-led court under Abdur Rehman" in Kot Lakhpat and Karachi labor unrest 1972.

Although Bhutto introduced labour laws for the welfare of workers and their families however in reality legislation at the time was the real cause of damage to labour and trade union movement. He effectively repressed trade unions and students' movement effectively and gradually these movements were taken over by right-wing. In order to divide the movement, Bhutto even tried to form his own trade union by the name of the Peoples Labour Federation. Even Bhutto went too far to justify his ruthless action against industrial workers by propagating that these unions had foreign agents working to destabilize the country. He also threatened the workers of the country that if they did not end their protest, “the strength of the street will be met by the strength of the state."

Events 
From January 1972, strikes and lockouts in Karachi became routine. Workers started occupying their factories and an important takeover was of Dawood Mills Karachi, which was led by Aziz-ul-Hasan and Riaz Ahmed. According to official estimates during five months between January and May 150 factories were encircled. Even newspapers carried threats of factories closures from industrialists if this labour unrest did not stop. Desperate appeals were made to the President of Pakistan to intervene. During this period workers were brutally killed, put into jail and shameful tactics were employed at police stations where trade union activists were allegedly sexually assaulted.

The unrest began on 6 June 1972 with workers protest at Feroz Sultan Mills located at SITE Town. On 7 June, workers encircled factory demanding for their wages and their share of the workers' participatory fund. Being unhappy with the unity of labour at the time, the State ordered a shootout on peaceful protestors. Police started firing on the workers and three workers killed. Among casualties was a leading figure of Muttahida Mazdoor Federation Shoaib Khan, next morning workers from all industrial estates of the city gathered at Khan's funeral which turned into a procession. This procession of workers began from Benaras Chowk and at the crossroads, police opened fire as marchers walked onto the main road killing ten workers and injuring dozens. These events triggered a mass workers' strike and over 900 units were closed. Nearly, in all factories of Karachi red and black flags raised. This strike had paralyzed all industrial zones and in 12 days of strike factories' production reduced to half. This strike finally ended on 18 June when a tribunal was set up by a High court judge with objectives to take action against responsible. However, a brutal repression of workers followed and 1200 were arrested and put into Karachi Jail.

Again this same episode repeated at Landhi Town, when striking workers occupied mills and refused to resume work, on 18 October the police and military used bulldozers to break factory walls and firing upon workers. Army supervised and ensured that workers were back to work and 100 workers killed. Dawn (newspaper) of 19 October 1972 reported incident in following words;“The conflict in Landhi started over wage demands in a government run machine tool factory. The protest spread to neighbouring textile mills and finally paramilitary forces literally bulldozed their way into a mill. Four persons were killed in the firing that took place.”A trade unionist Karamat Ali in an interview described movement's reasons in following words;

Both these incidents took place under Bhutto's government. He was sworn in as prime minister on December 19, 1971 and on February 10, 1972, he announced a labour policy which the trade unions rejected, because they expected much more, given his election campaign promises. People were getting impatient, which is why they mobilised in large numbers prompting Bhutto to use force.

Aftermath 
The next years of Bhutto regime saw these scenes repeated throughout country and there was no industrial zone of Pakistan, where workers didn't suffer crackdowns, State occupation of trade unions and massacres of workers' militant leaders. Notably Karachi's movement leader Bawar Khan was brutally tortured in jail, Tufail Abbas imprisoned and Meraj Muhammad Khan was tortured and lost much of his eyesight. The State further repressed trade movement in country through amending labour laws through a Presidential order in October 1974. This ordinance received much acclamation from industrial class as it allowed them to crush unions. This labour movement slow down by 1975 because all union were implicated in several cases. In 1977, Bhutto regime was overthrown by Muhammad Zia-ul-Haq, which unleashed new attacks on working class and Zia era remained darkest period in trade union history of Pakistan.

Legacy 
The Benaras Chowk was renamed as Shaheed Chowk (Matyr's Square) by workers and in the late 1980s it was renamed as Bacha Khan Chowk. A Shaheed Mazdoor Yadgari Committee has been set up which holds various public meeting to commemorate martyr workers. At graveyard of SITE area a memorial monument has been constructed with "Mazdoor Shaheed" words inscribed on it.

References

External links 

 A photo of the monument commemorating the Martyred workers

Further reading

 The Strength of the Street Meets the Strength of the State: The 1972 Labor Struggle in Karachi, Kamran Asdar Ali, International Journal of Middle East Studies, Vol. 37, No. 1 (Feb., 2005), pp. 83–107
 Behind the Headlines: Take-over of Valika, H. N. Gardezi, Pakistan Forum, Vol. 2, No. 7/8 (Apr. - May, 1972), pp. 16–18, Published by: Middle East Research and Information Project
 Koh-E-Noor Rayon under Workers' Control, Pakistan Forum, Vol. 2, No. 9/10 (Jun. - Jul., 1972), pp. 8–10+7, Published by: Middle East Research and Information Project
 From Pathan Colony to a Workers' State Iqbal Khan, Pakistan Forum, Vol. 2, No. 11 (Aug., 1972), pp. 4–8 Published by: Middle East Research and Information Project
 Who is Sabotaging Production?, Pakistan Forum, Vol. 3, No. 2 (Nov., 1972), pp. 5–6, Published by: Middle East Research and Information Project
 Why Were These Factories "Taken Over?", Pakistan Forum, Vol. 3, No. 2 (Nov., 1972), p. 7, Published by: Middle East Research and Information Project
 Behind the Headlines: Dawoods: Empire and the Terror, Pakistan Forum, Vol. 3, No. 3 (Dec., 1972), pp. 13–14+16, Published by: Middle East Research and Information Project



Labour disputes in Pakistan
Labour movement in Pakistan
1972 labor disputes and strikes
Massacres in Pakistan
Politics of Karachi
1972 in Pakistan
20th century in Karachi
History of Sindh (1947–present)
Protests in Pakistan
1972 murders in Pakistan